Valdera is the name of an area in the Province of Pisa in Tuscany comprising the following municipalities:

 Capannoli
 Casciana Terme Lari
 Chianni
 Crespina
 Lajatico 
 Palaia
 Peccioli
 Ponsacco
 Terricciola

The Valdera area usually includes the municipalities below as well, for social and economical reasons. They are all located near the lower part of the Arno river valley and near the Lucca plain.

 Pontedera
 Bientina
 Buti
 Calcinaia
 Santa Maria a Monte

Geography of Tuscany